Pessah Bar-Adon (Hebrew: פסח בר-אדון; b. 1907, d. 1985) was a Polish-born Israeli archaeologist and writer.

Early life
Born Pessah Panitsch in Kolno, Poland, to a Zionist, Haredi family, he was educated in a Jewish orthodox school and in Yeshivas. He immigrated to Israel in 1925. While working in housing and road construction to support himself, he studied for a degree in Middle Eastern studies at the Hebrew University of Jerusalem.

Career

For a period, he lived amongst Bedouins near Amman, Bet She'an, and Kuneitra in order to learn their lifestyle. Part of his motivation for this endeavor was to understand why many of the ancient Kings of Israel were originally shepherds. During this period he wore traditional Bedouin clothing and went by the name Aziz Effendi.

During the 1929 Palestine riots and the 1936–1939 Arab revolt in Palestine, he was an active member of the Haganah Jerusalem. Later he also took part in the Aliyah Bet.

In 1932 he participated in one of the first movies made about the Jewish Yishuv in Palestine, called "Sabra", directed by Aleksander Ford.

In 1939, he married Dorothy Kahn, an American journalist who fell in love with the Land of Israel, and the two moved to the Blumenfeld house in Moshav Merhavia. She died in 1950 at age 43.

Bar-Adon was involved in many archaeological excavations, among them: Bet Shearim, Tel Bet Yerah, and the discovery of the Nahal Mishmar hoard. He engaged in archaeology until the age of 70.

References

Hebrew University of Jerusalem alumni
Israeli archaeologists
1907 births
1985 deaths
Polish emigrants to Mandatory Palestine
Haganah members
Aliyah Bet activists
People from Kolno
20th-century Israeli Jews
20th-century archaeologists